"Heat of the Moment" is the first single released by English progressive rock supergroup Asia from their 1982 eponymous debut album. It was written by singer and bass guitarist John Wetton and keyboardist Geoff Downes.  It was named by Lee Zimmerman of Paste as Asia's signature song.

Background
Singer John Wetton said,

B-sides
"Time Again" is the B-side of the U.K. release. The song was written by all the band members, Geoff Downes, Steve Howe, Carl Palmer and John Wetton, and can also be found on the Asia album.

"Ride Easy" is the B-side of the singles released outside of the United Kingdom. This song was written by Wetton and Howe. It was never given a regular release on a studio album, but it was included in the EP Aurora (1986), released only in Japan. It was released on CD on The Very Best of Asia: Heat of the Moment (1982-1990) (2000).

Development
"Heat of the Moment" was the last song recorded for the album. John Kalodner of Geffen asked the band for a single: Wetton had an idea for the chorus and Downes had an idea that made the verse and they wrote the song in an afternoon. The line "You catch a pearl and ride the dragon's wings" was inspired by Roger Dean's artwork for the album.

Howe overdubbed his Gibson Les Paul Junior playing the rhythm guitar power chords in the verses seven times, each through a different amplifier, to get the "grungy" sound he wanted. During the song's middle eight, he doubled Downes' synth lick with a koto.

Reception
Billboard said that "this superstar quartet aims its soaring harmonies and tight arrangement at pop and beyond."

Track listing
US 7" single

UK 7" single

Personnel
 John Wetton – lead vocals, bass
 Geoff Downes – keyboards, backing vocals
 Steve Howe – guitar, koto, backing vocals
 Carl Palmer – drums, percussion
 Mike Stone – producer, engineer

Chart performance
"Heat of the Moment" reached #4 in both the Canadian Singles chart and on the Billboard Hot 100 chart. The single climbed to the top position on the U.S. Billboard Mainstream Rock chart, achieving six non-consecutive weeks at #1 in the spring and summer of 1982.

Weekly charts

Year-end charts

In popular culture 

 It appears in the TV show Supernatural, episode "Mystery Spot".
 In the 2001 South Park episode "Kenny Dies", Eric Cartman sings the song during a speech to the House of Representatives on behalf of stem cell research.
 In the 2005 film The 40-Year-Old Virgin.
 In the 2005 film The Matador.
 In the 2007 video game Guitar Hero: Rocks the 80's, as a cover version made by WaveGroup.

References

Asia (band) songs
1982 songs
1982 debut singles
Music videos directed by Godley and Creme
Songs written by John Wetton
Songs written by Geoff Downes
Song recordings produced by Mike Stone (record producer)
Geffen Records singles